Thales is a small crater located in the northeast part of the Moon, just to the west of the larger crater Strabo. To the southeast is the walled plain De La Rue. Thales has a sharp, circular rim that has received little erosion. The lunar surface around Thales has a ray system that extends for over 600 kilometers, and it is consequently mapped as part of the Copernican System.
. An area to the north-northwest of the crater is free of rays, however, indicating that the crater may have been formed by a low-angle impact from that direction. The inner wall has some terraces, particularly along the southern side. The sides have a higher albedo than the typical lunar terrain.

This crater has been noted for transient lunar phenomena. In 1892, E. E. Barnard observed a pale haze fill the crater interior, while the surroundings remained clear and sharply visible.

Satellite craters
By convention these features are identified on lunar maps by placing the letter on the side of the crater midpoint that is closest to Thales.

References

 
 
 
 
 
 
 
 
 
 
 
 

Impact craters on the Moon